is an official licensed football video game that featured all clubs and footballers from the Italian Serie A (SEASON 1994-95) and was released exclusively in Japan in 1995. It was licensed by Italian Football League and AIC (Associazione Italiana Calciatori). The game is based on the original video game Super Formation Soccer.

In the same year,  was released for the Turbo CD. The game structure differs from Super Formation Soccer '95.

Summary

In-game tricks and features
 On the Exhibition Player entry screen, on the second controller, while holding down X, L and R, press A. If the lowest entry on the screen turns into hiragana the player is successful in his action. He can now select the entry on the top-right of the Team Selection screen and he will be able to use three hidden teams (Human, Giappone and Masters). There is also the free option of editing/creating two "All-star" teams.
 While dribbling if the player press twice quickly in the direction that is moving in the player will jump.
 In an Offensive game in Practice Mode, if the player presses Select during a Throw in, Corner Kick, Goal Kick, etc., the remaining time will change to 45 minutes.
 If the player presses Select on the Team Selection screen, he can select Random Team. Also, the player can see some info about each team by pressing X. When the team is already selected, on the Member screen he can see the players' status/info by pressing X, and their attributes by pressing A.
 Initially the players' names are all in Japanese but the player can switch to English/Italian through the Options.
 If the player pauses the game during a match and press B the players' names will disappear. If he repeats this, their names will reappear.
 Put the cursor over the Situation Mode's 'Cleared' entry and press A and X at the same time. The player will be able to select Reverse Mode which has different conditions required to clear it.

Special editions

There are two alternative editions: Super Formation Soccer 95: della Serie A (UCC Xaqua) and Super Formation Soccer 95: della Serie A (Extra Package). The UCC Xaqua version is a kind of promotional edition, the idea was to promote a sports drink (energy drink) called Xaqua (manufactured by UCC and endorsed by the Italian Football League) with the participation or partnership of the Italian footballer Roberto Baggio (clearly visible on the back of the game packaging), via a contest held in 1995 in which the participants had to correctly answer three questions and return the postcard. The winners received the cartridge as a prize. Only 3000 copies were distributed. In the opening scene instead of having the cinematic intro sequence showing all the team logos, there is an advertisement of Xaqua featuring Roberto Baggio (1993 FIFA World Player of the Year). Also the box art is different, and in the UCC Xaqua version there is a strong hidden team called Xaqua. In the Extra Package edition there is a special book with all the 396 players' data.

Critical reception
On release, Famicom Tsūshin scored the Super Famicom version of the game a 26 out of 40, giving the PC Engine version a 24 out of 40. The Japanese website Wazap! gave the game a total score of 80 out of 100.

Audiovisual elements

Music
True to its convictions, Human offers music for each of the 18 clubs in the game. A little less powerful than in previous games, they are still very rhythmic and stick to the atmosphere of Italian football. AC Milan's theme is inspired by the hit "Go West", a song by Village People that eventually found greater success when it was covered in 1993 by Pet Shop Boys. The music is very often used in football stadiums.
The crowd noise is also much stronger than before. The goals are always accompanied by the mythical "GOOOOOAL!". Another detail, a derby match is announced by a short special music.

Soundtrack

Images
Screenshots showing the Super Formation Soccer 95: della Serie A (UCC Xaqua) opening scene which features Roberto Baggio.

See also
 Ace Striker, football video game licensed by Italian Football League and AIC (Associazione Italiana Calciatori)
 Captain Tsubasa 5: Hasha no Shogo Campione
 SNES Multitap
 List of PC Engine games

References

External links
 Game overview at broseb 
 Super Formation Soccer 95: della Serie A (BGM) at Nico Nico Douga
 Super Formation Soccer 95: della Serie A: UCC Xaqua (Box art) 
 Super Formation Soccer 95: della Serie A: UCC Xaqua 
 Power Fuel Xaqua (Energy drink) 
 Differences between the box art
 Formation Soccer 95 della Serie A at MobyGames

1995 video games
Association football video games
Human Entertainment games
Japan-exclusive video games
Sports video games set in Italy
Super Nintendo Entertainment System games
TurboGrafx-CD games
Video games developed in Japan
Video games set in 1995
Video game sequels
Multiplayer and single-player video games